Tossal Gros may refer to:
 El Tossal Gros,  Mont-ral, Alt Camp
 Tossal Gros,  Figuerola del Camp, Alt Camp and Montblanc, Conca de Barberà
 Tossal Gros,  Vallclara and Vimbodí i Poblet, Conca de Barberà and Prades, Baix Camp
 Tossal Gros,  Juneda, Garrigues
 Tossal Gros,  Juncosa, Garrigues
 Tossal Gros,  Vinebre and La Palma d'Ebre, Ribera d'Ebre
 Tossal Gros, el Cogul, Garrigues
 Tossal Gros, Arbeca, Garrigues
 Tossal Gros,  Vallbona de les Monges, Urgell
 Tossal Gros,  Àger, Noguera
 Tossal Gros,  Castelló de Farfanya, Noguera
 Tossal Gros, Os de Balaguer, Noguera
 Tossal Gros,  Torrelameu, Noguera
 Tossal Gros, l'Espluga Calba, Garrigues
 Tossal Gros, Os de Balaguer, Noguera
 Tossal Gros, Bellver de Cerdanya, Cerdanya
 Tossal Gros, Castell de Mur, Pallars Jussà
 Tossal Gros, formerly in Espluga de Serra, Alta Ribagorça, now in Tremp, Pallars Jussà
 Tossal Gros, La Pobla de Segur, Pallars Jussà
 Tossal Gros, Sarroca de Bellera, Pallars Jussà
 Tossal Gros, Senterada and la La Torre de Cabdella, Pallars Jussà
 Tossal Gros, Tremp, Pallars Jussà
 Tossal Gros, Sanaüja and Biosca, Segarra
 Tossal Gros,  Massoteres, Segarra
 Tossal Gros, Alfés and Alcanó, Segrià
 Tossal Gros, Alfés, Segrià
 Tossal Gros, Almatret, Segrià
 Tossal Gros, Alpicat, Segrià
 Tossal Gros,  Sarroca de Lleida, Segrià
 Tossal Gros,  La Pobla de Massaluca, Terra Alta
 Tossal Gros,  Blancafort, Conca de Barberà and Vallbona de les Monges, Urgell
 Tossal Gros, Montagut and Oix,  Montagut and Oix, Garrotxa
 Tossal Gros, Serra del Turmell, also known as El Turmell, highest point of the Serra del Turmell, Baix Maestrat, Valencian Community
 Tossal Gros de Vallbona, l'Espluga de Francolí, Conca de Barberà and Vallbona de les Monges, Urgell
 Tossal Gros d'Ollers, Barberà de la Conca, Conca de Barberà
 Tossal Gros, Ulldecona, Montsià